The XM7, previously known as the XM5, is the U.S. Army variant of the SIG MCX Spear, a 6.8×51mm (.277 in), gas-operated, magazine-fed, assault rifle designed by SIG Sauer for the Next Generation Squad Weapon Program in 2022 to replace the M4 carbine. The XM7 features a free-floating reinforced M-LOK handguard for direct accessory attachment onto the "negative space" (hollow slot) mounting points.

History 
In January 2019, the United States Army began the Next Generation Squad Weapon Program to find replacements for the M4 carbine and M249 light machine gun. In September 2019, SIG Sauer submitted its designs. The XM7 is designed to fire the 6.8×51mm (.277 in) SIG Fury cartridge in response to concerns that improvements in body armor would diminish the effectiveness of common battlefield rounds such as the 5.56×45mm NATO (used in the M4 and M249) and 7.62×51mm NATO. Army Times describes this as an "intermediate caliber 6.8mm cartridge". The ballistics of the .277 Fury indicate that it is likely a fully powered cartridge as it has higher chamber pressure, velocity and energy on target than 7.62×51 mm NATO.

On 19 April 2022, the Army awarded a 10-year contract to SIG Sauer to produce the XM7 rifle, along with the XM250 light machine gun, to replace the M4 and M249, respectively. Originally the rifle was designated the XM5, as the names were chosen as the next numbers sequentially to the weapons they will replace, but in January 2023 the Army announced it was changing the name of the rifle from XM5 to XM7 to avoid a trademark conflict with Colt's M5 carbine.

The first batch of 25 XM7s and 15 XM250s are planned to be delivered in late 2023. The Army plans to procure a total of 107,000 rifles and 13,000 automatic rifles for close combat forces including infantry, cavalry scouts, combat engineers, forward observers and combat medics; there are no plans initially to issue the weapons to non-combat soldiers. The contract has the capacity to build additional weapons should the U.S. Marine Corps and U.S. Special Operations Command choose to be included.

Design 

The proposed combat ammunition load for each soldier will be 140 total rounds, distributed across seven 20-round magazines, in total weighing . Compared to the M4A1 weighing  unsuppressed with a basic combat load of 210 rounds in seven 30-round magazines in total weighing , the XM7 weighs about  more and each soldier carries roughly a  heavier load with 70 fewer rounds.

Operational testing of the XM7 rifle, the XM250 automatic rifle, and the XM157 Fire Control Optic platform agnostic unit and the 6.8×51mm ammunition squad weaponry is set to begin in 2024 and does not guarantee actual widespread future issue.

References

External links

Weapons and ammunition introduced in 2019
6.8mm firearms
Assault rifles of the United States
SIG Sauer rifles